TTB may refer to the following:

Alcohol and Tobacco Tax and Trade Bureau
Ticking time bomb scenario
Tooele Transcript-Bulletin
Tortolì Airport
Twin Traction Beam
Türk Ticaret Bankası, a defunct Turkish bank
Telegraphic transfer buying rate, an exchange rate convention in Japan
Top to bottom, a group of writing systems

Music
The Trinity Band, an English soul quintet formed in 2004
Trigger the Bloodshed, an English music group formed in 2006
Tedeschi Trucks Band, a blues group from Florida

Television
Time Traveling Bong a miniseries that aired on Comedy Central